Ackley Bridge is a British comedy-drama series set in a multicultural academy school of the same name. The series is filmed in Halifax, West Yorkshire and it began broadcasting on Channel 4 on 7 June 2017. In the fourth series, Ackley Bridge saw a major overhaul, including different time slots, a shortened runtime, several new characters to replace cast exits and moving the series onto streaming platform All 4.

The first three series of Ackley Bridge received praise from critics and viewers, who liked that the programme represented minority groups and tackled real-world issues. Main cast members Poppy Lee Friar, Amy-Leigh Hickman and Sunetra Sarker have been received awards for their portrayals of their respective characters, as well as the series itself garnering awards and nominations at various ceremonies. However, the fourth series faced criticism from the public. They felt that Channel 4 moving Ackley Bridge to a 6pm time slot had led to the edgy storylines being softened and that the long-term characters did not receive enough screen-time. After a fifth series that received a late night slot, Channel 4 confirmed that they had decided not to renew Ackley Bridge further.

Production
In early 2017, Channel 4 announced The ABC, a six-part school drama produced by The Forge. The series follows the merger of two schools in a segregated White and Pakistani community due to budget cuts, exploring "the turbulent school experience, covering the challenges of prejudice and cultural issues in the school environment, as well as the humour, relationships and conflict had by the pupils, teachers and parents." St Catherine's Catholic High School in Halifax is used as the filming location for Ackley Bridge College. The series was later renamed Ackley Bridge.

Following the Manchester Arena bombing, the first episode was re-edited prior to airing as there were scenes showing "a troubled student strap a fake bomb to himself in order to disrupt the merging of a predominantly white and a predominantly Asian school." A spokesperson commented: "In light of the tragic events in Manchester, the first episode of forthcoming drama series Ackley Bridge is being re-edited." Ahead of the first series premiere, additional content from the show was shared on Snapchat for "high school age characters to tell their stories in the way young people are" to introduce the characters. Further episodes will "be subsidised with additional videos that will help build the world outside of the allocated TV broadcast."

The first series aired from 7 June to 12 July 2017, and Ackley Bridge was subsequently renewed by Channel 4 for a second series consisting of 12 episodes. Following the broadcast of an eight-part third series, Ackley Bridge was again renewed by Channel 4, with the fourth series initially set to premiere in September 2020. However, due to the impact of the COVID-19 pandemic on television, production was postponed. This meant that the premiere of the series was postponed to April 2021. It was later confirmed that the first episode would premiere on Channel 4 at 19 April 2021 with a revised timeslot of 6pm; the following nine episodes were released afterwards as a boxset on All 4. Another of the changes made to the series included the runtime, which was halved from 60 minutes to 30 minutes. Rebecca Holdsworth, Channel 4's commissioning executive, stated that the shortened runtime was to reflect the viewing habits of younger viewers and to give the series "a new look and feel".

On 17 June 2021, it was announced in a report by Production Weekly that production on the fifth series of Ackley Bridge had commenced that week. The series premiered on All 4 on 11 July 2022. In November 2022, Channel 4 announced that they had decided not to renew Ackley Bridge further. In a statement, they said: "As a broadcaster, we’re immensely proud of Ackley Bridge, which over the last five series has received praise for the way in which it has tackled real-life situations and issues in an irreverent and insightful way. However, Channel 4 has a responsibility to continuously look for new and innovative ideas and we have made the difficult decision to not greenlight another series."

Casting

The cast, main and supporting, are a mix of experienced and trained actors, as well as street cast actors. Amy-Leigh Hickman plays Nasreen Paracha, daughter of Kaneez Paracha, who is described as a "quieter and tamer" student, as well as "intelligent", but "ballsy." She felt comfortable acting scenes with Poppy Lee Friar, who plays best friend Missy Booth, due to having a friendship in real life. Friar says she loves portraying Missy, who she describes as "sassy, saucy and a survivor." Television newcomers Nazmeen Kauser and Esa Ashraf play Razia and Saleem Paracha, Kaneez's two other children.

Former EastEnders actors Jo Joyner and Paul Nicholls received the parts of married couple Mandy Carter, the headteacher of Ackley Bridge College, and Steve Bell, a PE teacher. Joyner described Mandy as "career driven", who has "worked so hard over the years to get to the level she's at." Joyner added that she likes the fact her character is not interested in having children. Adil Ray was cast as school sponsor Sadiq Nawaz, as well as Liz White also joining the series as English teacher Emma Keane. Maariah Hussain and Samuel Bottomley, both students at Yorkshire School of Acting in Bradford, were cast as Alya Nawaz and Jordan Wilson, respectively. Hussain described her character as "super intelligent, fiercely righteous, and a bit of a mean girl", but noted that Alya is as "insecure as any teenage girl". Jordan is billed as an artist that is "badly behaved and not fazed by getting into trouble". Matt Zina, principal of Hussain and Bottomley's acting school, said Ackley Bridge is Hussain's first role, noting her excitement, and he described Bottomley as an "exciting young actor". Cody Ryan got the part of Hayley Booth through an acting workshop at her school, Buttershaw Business and Enterprise College, which was run by Beverley Keogh casting agency. Students from Trinity Academy, North Halifax Grammar School, The Crossley Heath School, and Calderdale College feature in the series.

In the second series, Tony Jayawardena was cast as Rashid Hyatt, a science teacher at Ackley Bridge College, and a love interest of Kaneez. Adam Fielding and Jay Saighal also appear. Megan Parkinson was then cast in the role of Sam Murgatroyd, a love interest for Nasreen. Vicky Entwistle guest-starred in the series as the secret wife of Iqbal, as well as Kimberley Walsh, who appeared as "home-wrecking netball teacher" Claire Butterworth. For the third series, several new cast members were cast, including Phoebe Tuffs-Berry, Zara Salim, Hareet Deol, Rob James-Collier, Charlie Hardwick, and Ty Glaser in regular roles. James Atherton and Natalie Gavin, amongst others, also joined the series in recurring roles.

In December 2019, Ackley Bridge was renewed for a fourth series, and it was announced that the series would face an overhaul, including cast changes. Robyn Cara was cast as Kayla Azfal, a "funny, mixed-race pupil torn between her white mum's family and her traditional Pakistani dad's family", alongside sister Marina Perry, played by Carla Woodcock, who was described by Digital Spy as a "mean girl". Yasmin Al-Khudhairi was cast as Fizza Akhtar, the best friend of Kayla. Ryan Dean was cast in the role of Johnny Cooper, a love interest for both Kayla and Fizza, and it was also confirmed that Connor McIntyre would guest star as Johnny's grandfather. Tahir Randhawa, played by Shobhit Piasa, was also introduced as the nephew of Kaneez. The numerous castings came as a result of numerous cast members leaving following the ending of the third series. For the fifth series, the role of Marina was recast to Megan Morgan. New castings for the series included Adam Little as Kyle Dobson, the younger brother of Marina, and Laila Zaidi as Asma Farooqi, a new "hotshot teacher [who] ruffles some feathers".

Episodes

Reception

Critical reception
Since the series was announced, Ackley Bridge has been compared to the BBC school drama Waterloo Road, with Duncan Lindsay from Metro opining that "Channel 4 have been crying out for a solid drama to fit into the early night slot" and that there has been a lack of a "solid school based drama". The series has also been compared to BBC's other long-running school drama series Grange Hill, as Michael Hogan from The Daily Telegraph stated "it could be described as Grange Hill with a mobile phone and a northern accent." Sam Wollaston from The Guardian wrote that Ackley Bridge is similar to a mixture of Waterloo Road and Shameless, and praised their use of social media in the series. He added that the series represents real-life issues and that cultural differences "aren't denied", while also avoiding the usage of stereotypes. Friar and Ryan received praise from viewers in the fourth episode of series one, where the episode revolved around the Booth sisters dealing with the death of their grandmother, played by Rita May, which leads to Hayley being placed in care. Viewers also praised scenes of Lila Sharif, played by Anneika Rose, coming out as lesbian to her students.

Once again, Friar received praise during the teenage pregnancy storyline in series two, and the portrayal of "supportive female friendships" also received a positive reception. The child abuse storyline in series two involving Jordan (Bottomley) and Cory Wilson (Sam Retford) received praise from media and viewers, who thanked the producers for handling a difficult subject gracefully; Joe Anderton of Digital Spy added that "we can definitely put all the comparisons to Waterloo Road aside". Retford received praise again following Cory's troubled home life, mental illness and poverty being covered, with Digital Spy noting that the Ackley Bridge "has never been one to shy away from serious, real-world issues". In 2019, Nasreen was listed as one of Autostraddles Favourite Lesbian, Bisexual and Trans TV Characters of 2019, and was described as "groundbreaking". It was noted that representation of Muslims on primetime television is rare, and that "to have a young queer Muslim woman as, essentially, the lead character in an ensemble show" was something to be praised.

The second and third series of Ackley Bridge was acclaimed by critics. The Guardian listed the second series as one of the best series to watch in the week it premiered, describing it as a midpoint between fellow Channel 4 programmes Hollyoaks and Shameless. They expressed their admiration for the series exploring serious issue such as race and religion without "lapsing into preachy worthiness". In a similar article a year later, Sarah Hughes of The Guardian praised the third series for continuing to explore dark moments while also balancing them with light-hearted comedy. Hughes appreciated Ackley Bridge "occasionally breaking out a musical interlude and tackling its teenage love stories with sensitivity and heart". Following the fourth series, Kyann-Sian Williams of NME wrote that Ackley Bridge "has a few lessons to learn" from Waterloo Road. Williams accredited Ackley Bridge with having much more diversity than Waterloo Road and felt that it gave a more representative view of northern life, but felt that Waterloo Road had more engaging drama. Williams proposed that Ackley Bridges earlier timeslot of 6pm for the fourth series had led to the edge being taken away and a level of naivety being added to the storylines. She also expressed a desire to see more adult-themed plotlines. Despite her criticism, she noted that the series is "worth a watch" and admired that younger viewers had formed a connection to the series. Hello magazine also wrote that viewers disliked the balance of new characters to old characters in the fourth series, noting that they wanted to see more of the original cast members.

Awards and nominations

References

External links
 
 

 
2017 British television series debuts
2022 British television series endings
2010s British LGBT-related drama television series
2010s high school television series
2020s British LGBT-related drama television series
2020s high school television series
British high school television series
British teen drama television series
British television soap operas
Channel 4 television dramas
English-language television shows
Fictional schools
Gay-related television shows
Halifax, West Yorkshire
Islam in fiction
Lesbian-related television shows
Race and ethnicity in television
Teenage pregnancy in television
Television series about families
Television shows set in West Yorkshire
Youth culture in the United Kingdom
Television series by All3Media